The Classical Liberal Party (KLP), also known as the Liberal Party, is a classical liberal and libertarian political party in Sweden founded in 2004.

The leader of the party is Lisa Missing. The party has its headquarters located in Stockholm and regional representatives in Jönköping and Linköping.

Ideology 
The following quote is taken from the English information section of the party's official website:

Electoral history

Riksdag 
The Classical Liberal Party has participated in four general elections for the Swedish Riksdag. Their best result was in the 2018 general elections when the party got 1,504 votes, or 0.02%.

European Parliament 
KLP has participated in two elections for the European Parliament. it first campaigned during the 2014 European Parliament election, although it was eligible to participate in previous election in 2009.

Footnotes

External links 
 Official website (introduction in English)

Liberal parties in Sweden
Classical liberal parties
Political parties established in 2004
Minor political parties in Sweden
2004 establishments in Sweden